The Champions Classic was a golf tournament on the Champions Tour from 1983 to 1985. It was played in Sparks, Nevada at the Wildcreek Golf Club.

The purse for the 1985 tournament was US$200,000, with $30,000 going to the winner. The tournament was founded in 1983 as the Gatlin Brothers Seniors Golf Classic.

Winners
The Champions Classic
1985 Peter Thomson

Gatlin Brothers Seniors Golf Classic
1984 Dan Sikes
1983 Don January

Source:

References

Former PGA Tour Champions events
Golf in Nevada
Sports in Reno, Nevada
Sparks, Nevada
Recurring sporting events established in 1983
Recurring sporting events disestablished in 1985
1983 establishments in Nevada
1985 disestablishments in Nevada